The Registrar of Companies (ROC) is an office under the Indian Ministry of Corporate Affairs that deals with administration of the Companies Act, 2013, The Limited Liability Partnership Act, 2008, The Company Secretaries Act, 1980 and The Chartered Accountants Act, 1949. These officers are from Indian Corporate Law Service cadre. 'ICLS' is an organised Group A service recruitment of which is done by UPSC through Civil Service Examination since 2009 along with other services like IRS, IAS & IPS etc. There are currently 25 Registrars of Companies (ROC) operating from offices in all major states of India. Some states, such as Maharashtra and Tamil Nadu, have two ROCs each. Also in some places unified ROC offices manned by senior Group A ICLS officers are located in capital cities like Jammu and Srinagar. Section 609 of the Companies Act, 1956 tasks the ROCs with the primary duty of registering companies and LLPs floated in the respective states and the union territories under their administration.

The ROCs also ensure that LLPs comply with the statutory requirements under the Companies Act. The office of the ROC maintains a registry of records related to companies registered with them, and permits the general public to access this data on payment of a fee. The Union Government maintains administrative control over ROCs through Regional Directors. There are 7 Regional Directors, and they supervise the functioning of ROCs within their respective regions.

The Registrar of Company takes care of company registration (also known as incorporation) in India, completes reporting and regulation of companies and their directors and shareholders, and also oversees government reporting of various matters including the annual filling of various documents.

See also
 The Companies Act, 1956
 Ministry of Corporate Affairs
 Companies Act, 2013
Companies (1st Amendment) Act, 2015
 List of company registers

References

External links
 ROC page on MCA website

Indian company law
Government agencies of India
Regulatory agencies of India
Ministry of Corporate Affairs
Registrars of companies